Abu Makhlad Abdallah ibn Yahya al-Tabari was an Iranian statesman from Tabaristan, who served the Ziyarid ruler Mardavij (r. 930–935), and later the Buyid ruler of Iraq, Mu'izz al-Dawla (r. 945–967). He may have been the son of Ali Yahya ibn Abdallah al-Tabari, a secretary that served the Baridis of Basra.

Sources 
 
 

Buyid officials
Year of birth unknown
10th-century deaths
History of Mazandaran Province
People from Mazandaran Province
10th-century Iranian politicians